The Akhil Bharatiya Adhivakta Parishad (ABAP); English: (All India Lawyers' Council) is a right-wing Indian organisation of lawyers associated with the nationalist Rashtriya Swayamsevak Sangh. It is often referred to as the "RSS lawyers' wing." It aims to work for a judicial system which is "in harmony with the genius of the nation and in consonance with Bharatiya traditions."

It was founded in 1992 by the Hindu nationalist thinker and social reformer Dattopant Thengadi.

History 
The ABAP has its genesis in the national emergency of 1975–77, which suspension of civil rights, censorship of the press, and mass incarceration of political and social activists. During this time, various regional legal organizations were formed, including the Nationalist Lawyer's Forum in West Bengal in 1977.

Later, in Maharashtra, the Junior Lawyers Forum was formed in Nagpur in the 1980's.  In Kerala, the Bharatiya Abhivasaka Parishad was formed in 1987 at Ernakulam. In the state of Uttar Pradesh, Adhivakta Parishad Uttar Pradesh was formed in 1992.

Finally, on 7 September 1992, with the efforts of Dattopant Thengadi and other lawyers, the idea of the Akhil Bhartiya Adhivakta Parishad as an umbrella organisation for all the like-minded regional lawyers' organisations working, which became affiliated to the ABAP. Later, state units of the Adhivakta Parishad were formed in other states.

The Akhil Bharatiya Adhivakta Parishad was formally constituted in Delhi on 21 and 22 April 2001 and was registered under the Societies Registration Act XXI of 1860 at the office of the Delhi Registrar of Societies on 4 May 1992.

Organizational structure 
 The founding members of the ABAP included H. R. Khanna, E. Venkat Ramaiya, Rama Jois, Jitender Veer Gupta, Guman Mal Lodha, U. R. Lalit, and Ram Jethmalani.
 National Level: There is a National Executive of the Parishad consisting of the President, Vice-President, General Secretary, Organising Secretary, Treasurer, Secretaries, Zonal Secretaries and Members. Further, there is a National Council of the Adhivakta Parishad which is the highest policy and decision-making body in all matters pertaining to the Constitution, Organisation, finance and other   activities of the Parishad. All the members of the National Executive and 7 members from each State Level Constituent Organisation, affiliated with the Parishad, constitute the National Council.
 State Level: Every State Level Constituent Organisation, affiliated to the Parishad, has its State Executive body. District committees are formed under the guidance and  approval of the State Executive Committee. For a large district, Sub-Divisional Committee may be formed under the guidance and approval of the District and State Committee. Individual Court Units are formed and function under the guidance and approval of the District and State Committee. These Court Units are  the micro-level units of the Parishad.  Further, to make the organisation gender inclusive and truly representational, pursuant to the conference of women Advocates in Indore, the Adhivakta Parishad resolved that in each functional unit one vice president, one joint secretary and two executive members shall be women. This is apart from women occupying the posts of President, General secretary in some states and local units.  Every three years a National Conference is held where thousands of advocates  from all over the country participate. The National Council meets every two years, whereas the National Executive, wherein the General secretaries of all the state units are special invitees, meets every year.

Activities 

 Nyaya Kendra–One of the flagship projects of the ABAP, the Nyaya Kendras are legal aid centres established to make justice accessible to the socially and economically excluded section of the society.
 Legal Awareness Camp - To organise Legal Awareness Camps at the doorstep of the targeted people/community in order to make them aware about their individual rights or collective rights as the Citizen of the Country.
 Seminar/Symposium/Workshop- The ABAP regularly organise National/State/District/Sub-Division/Court Level Seminars, Symposiums and Workshop.
 Study Circle - The Court units organise a periodical study circle in their respective units under the guidance of Senior Advocates and with the co-operation of the Junior Advocates on subject matters like a particular Statute/Act/Law, its application and operation in society, on new Bills, on an amendment to an Act, or on any other issue as required.
 Public Interest Litigation –The ABAP has utilised the tool of PIL from time to time in order to make intervention and espouse cause on behalf of the vulnerable sections of the society like the Scheduled Castes and Tribes, the farmers, the informal sector workers, women etc. Noticeably, the Parishad does not file cases on these issues in its name. The local grass root activists, organisations are represented, assisted and guided by the advocates from Parishad.
 Study and Research Group- Similar to a study circle at the court units, a study and research group is formed and operates at every State and at the National level in order to work on the Bills, new/amended Acts, Laws and Rules.
The ABAP publishes a quarterly bilingual magazine called 'Nyaya Pravah'.

Prominent members 

 N. Santosh Hegde, former judge of the Supreme Court and former Lokayukta of the Karnataka.
 Adarsh Kumar Goel, appointed as a Justice of the Supreme Court of India in 2014, served as the General Secretary of the Adhivakta Parishad.

References

Sangh Parivar
Political organisations based in India
1992 establishments in India
Far-right politics in India
Hinduism-related controversies